Andres Jasson (born January 17, 2002) is an American professional soccer player who plays for Major League Soccer club New York City FC.

Club career 
Jasson grew up in Greenwich, Connecticut and was raised by parents from Argentina (father) and Spain (mother).
A four-star recruit, he signed a National Letter of Intent to play college soccer for Yale University. Jasson enrolled in Yale in August 2020, but due to the ongoing COVID-19 pandemic, the Ivy League soccer season was delayed to February 2021, before Jasson could play a competitive game for the Bulldogs.

On November 19, 2020, Jasson signed a homegrown player contract with New York City FC, forgoing his four years of collegiate eligibility. On December 15, 2020, he made his professional debut, coming on in the 70th minute of a CONCACAF Champions League match against UANL Tigres.

International career 
Jasson has regularly appeared with the United States youth national team setup, joining the U-15 boys' team in 2016 and 2017, before joining the U.S. under-17 men's team at the October 2018 U17 International Youth Tournament in England.

Career statistics

Club

Honors 
New York City FC
MLS Cup: 2021
Campeones Cup: 2022

References

External links 
 Andres Jasson at TopDrawer Soccer
 Andres Jasson at U.S. Soccer

2002 births
Living people
Sportspeople from Greenwich, Connecticut
Soccer players from Connecticut
American soccer players
American people of Argentine descent
American people of Spanish descent
Association football midfielders
New York City FC players
Yale Bulldogs men's soccer players
Homegrown Players (MLS)
Major League Soccer players